Phnom Thnout-Phnom Pok Wildlife Sanctuary (Khmer: ដែនជម្រកសត្វព្រៃភ្នំត្នោត-ភ្នំពក) is a 42,097 ha protected area in northern Cambodia, located in Siem Reap province. The area was formally protected as a wildlife sanctuary in August 2017. The area is supported by Our Future Organization, with the conservation program developing out of the BeTreed ecotourism social enterprise first established in 2013.

More than 70 species have been recorded at the site, and the area is of particular importance for a number of endangered species including banteng, green peafowl, and pileated gibbon. The protected area is under threat from hunting (especially snaring), logging and illegal land clearance for agriculture and speculation.

References

External 

 Map of protected areas in Cambodia

Wildlife sanctuaries of Cambodia
Protected areas of Cambodia
Protected areas established in 2017